Sinead Chambers (born 1 February 1992) is an Irish badminton player. She competed for Northern Ireland at the 2010, 2014 and 2018 Commonwealth Games. She was the champion at the 2012 Irish Future Series tournament in the women's doubles event with her partner Jennie King and became the runner-up in the singles event.

Chambers graduated from the Ulster University with a first class honours in Physiotherapy and became a members of Chartered Society of Physiotherapy, Health and Care Professions Council, and Association of Chartered Physiotherapists in Sports & Exercise Medicines. Her brother Ciaran Chambers also a professional badminton player.

Achievements

BWF International Challenge/Series
Women's singles

Women's doubles

Mixed doubles

 BWF International Challenge tournament
 BWF International Series tournament
 BWF Future Series tournament

References

External links
 

1992 births
Living people
Sportspeople from Belfast
Irish female badminton players
Badminton players at the 2018 Commonwealth Games
Badminton players at the 2014 Commonwealth Games
Badminton players at the 2010 Commonwealth Games
Commonwealth Games competitors for Northern Ireland
Alumni of Ulster University